Matthew Knies (born October 17, 2002) is an American ice hockey forward for the University of Minnesota of the National Collegiate Athletic Association (NCAA). Knies was drafted 57th overall by the Toronto Maple Leafs in the 2021 NHL Entry Draft.

Playing career
Knies played two full seasons for the Tri-City Storm of the United States Hockey League (USHL), where he recorded 31 goals and 56 assists in 90 games. He began his collegiate career for Minnesota during the 2021–22 season. During his freshman season, he ranked tied for third on the team, and first among freshman, with 10 goals and 17 assists for 27 points in 29 games. Following an outstanding season, he was a unanimous pick for the Big Ten All-Freshman Team, and was named a finalist for Big Ten Freshman of the Year.

Knies was drafted in the second round, 57th overall, by the Toronto Maple Leafs in the 2021 NHL Entry Draft.

International play
Knies represented the United States at the 2022 World Junior Ice Hockey Championships, where he appeared in one game before the tournament was cancelled due to the COVID-19 pandemic.

On January 13, 2022, Knies was named to Team USA's roster to represent the United States at the 2022 Winter Olympics.

Personal life 
Knies has an older brother, Phillip, who played hockey at Miami University and Bentley University. They are the sons of Miroslav and Michaela Knies, who immigrated to the United States from Slovakia before Matthew's birth. Knies is fluent in Slovak, which he uses to speak to his grandparents. Growing up in Arizona, Knies was a fan of the Arizona Coyotes.

Career statistics

Regular season and playoffs

International

Awards and honours

References

External links
 

2002 births
Living people
Minnesota Golden Gophers men's ice hockey players
Toronto Maple Leafs draft picks
Sportspeople from Phoenix, Arizona
Tri-City Storm players
Ice hockey players at the 2022 Winter Olympics
Olympic ice hockey players of the United States